Buena Vista Ski Area is a downhill ski and snowboard area located in Beltrami County, Minnesota, United States, near the city of Bemidji.

History
Leonard R. Dickinson cleared the first ski run in 1936. The original chalet, constructed from a grain bin, was at the top of Beltrami's Bowl. In 1949 the first rope tow was installed, followed by chairlifts in 1975.

References

External links
Buena Vista Official Website

Beltrami County, Minnesota
Ski areas and resorts in Minnesota